Jalmar Castrén  (14 December 1873 – 19 February 1946) was a Finnish politician. He was a member of the Senate of Finland. 

He was born in Alatornio.

He died in Helsinki, aged 72.

1873 births
1946 deaths
People from Tornio
People from Oulu Province (Grand Duchy of Finland)
Young Finnish Party politicians
National Coalition Party politicians
Finnish senators
Ministers of Transport and Public Works of Finland
People of the Finnish Civil War (White side)